Marion Janet Greeves, MBE  (née Cadbury; 18 July 1894 – 7 July 1979) was the first one of only two female members of the Senate of Northern Ireland, having been elected to serve as an independent member on 20 June 1950, retiring on 10 June 1969.

Greeves, who was born in England, was the daughter of George Cadbury, a Quaker philanthropist, and his second wife, Elizabeth Mary Taylor. She married linen manufacturer William Edward Greeves (1890–1960), Deputy Lieutenant and High Sheriff of County Armagh, who was also a Quaker, on 14 February 1918, in Bournville. The couple had five children; two daughters and three sons. She lived a relatively normal life at Ardeevin House, Portadown, County Armagh. A Girl Guides centre is named in her honour, she was President of the organisation in Ulster. In 1948, Marion Greeves was awarded the MBE. She died on 7 July 1979, less than two weeks before her 85th birthday.

References

1895 births
1979 deaths
Quakers from Northern Ireland
English Quakers
Members of the Senate of Northern Ireland 1949–1953
Members of the Senate of Northern Ireland 1953–1957
Members of the Senate of Northern Ireland 1957–1961
Members of the Senate of Northern Ireland 1961–1965
Members of the Senate of Northern Ireland 1965–1969
Girlguiding
Cadbury
Scouting pioneers
Members of the Order of the British Empire
Linen industry in Ireland
Women members of the Senate of Northern Ireland
People from Portadown
Independent members of the Senate of Northern Ireland
Ulster Unionist Party members of the Senate of Northern Ireland